People's Magazine, also known as People's or People's Story Magazine, was an American literary magazine that was published from 1906 to 1924. 

People's Magazine was first published in July 1906 by Street & Smith in New York City. This first issue contained fiction, articles, and poems. The intent of People's was to be a companion to the literary magazine The Popular Magazine. It was later published by Lily, Wait & Co.

When the magazine was first published, it contained both previously published and new material. Contents included the reprinting of work previously written by notable poets and essayists. In November 1906, the magazine announced that it would no longer contain reprinted material. From the magazine's December issue onward, People's published only original and copyrighted material.

From 1906 to 1909, the magazine was edited by Archibald Lowery Sessions, who succeeded Lee D. Brown. In 1909, John W. Harding became editor of the magazine. It was advertised as offering instructive and amusing literature.

In 1921, the magazine became an all-fiction publication and no longer accepted articles or illustrations. At the time, Sessions was editor of the magazine. The following text was written in The Writer about what the magazine was looking for:

Notable contributors to People's included Clinton H. Stagg, Albert Payson Terhune, Ellis Parker Butler, Eden Phillpotts, Alfred Damon Runyon, Zoe Anderson Norris, and H. Bedford-Jones.

People's Magazine ceased publication in 1924 after 279 issues.

See also 
 People (magazine)

References

External links

Magazines established in 1906
Magazines disestablished in 1924

Pulp magazines
1906 establishments in New York City

Magazines published in New York City
1924 disestablishments in New York (state)
Defunct literary magazines published in the United States